Rikhak may refer to:
 Rikhak-e Olya
 Rikhak-e Sofla